Softball at the 2004 Summer Olympics was held at the Olympic Softball Stadium in the Helliniko Olympic Complex from August 14 to 23. The United States (USA) won the gold while Australia (AUS) took silver and Japan (JPN) got bronze.

It was one of the three sports at the Athens Olympics that was for women only along with Synchronized Swimming and Rhythmic Gymnastics.

Eight teams competed for the gold medal in only the third appearance of the sport at the Summer Olympics.

Medalists

In one of the most dominating runs in softball history, the United States team led by head coach Mike Candrea won the gold medal by defeating Australia 5-1 in the championship game on August 23. It was the first time in 9 games that an opponent scored a run against Team USA. Crystl Bustos hit two home runs to provide all the run-support that pitcher Lisa Fernandez required. Fernandez pitched all six innings, picking up her second win against Australia in as many days. She also won the semi-final game.

Throughout the tournament Team USA outscored its opponents 51-1. Team USA has won the Olympic gold medal in softball for the third straight time.

Australia's silver medal marks its best result in Olympic softball history. Japan earned the bronze medal after defeating China in the semi-final, and losing to Australia in the Bronze medal game.

Participants

Results
Starting August 14, there were four preliminary games each day until August 20 for a total of 28 games. 
Two semi-final games were played August 22, with the game for third place following later that day. The final game for the gold medal was played on August 23 at 4pm local time.

Standings

Preliminary round

August 14

August 15

August 16
09:30

12:00

17:00

19:30

August 17

09:30

12:00

17:00

19:30

August 18
09:30

12:00

17:00

19:30

August 19
09:30

12:00

17:00

19:30

August 20
09:30

12:00

17:00

19:30

** Perfect game

Medal round
The semi-final game between the #3 and #4 ranked teams (Japan and China) is an elimination game, with the loser out. The winner faces the loser of the other semifinal in the bronze medal game later Sunday night. The loser of the bronze medal game received the bronze medal. The winner of that game faces the winner of the Australia vs. United States semifinal in the gold medal game, with the winner of that game receiving gold and the loser receiving silver.

Semifinals
August 22 9:30

August 22 12:20

Bronze medal game
August 22 17:00

Gold medal game
August 23 16:00

External links
Official result book – Softball

2004 Summer Olympics events
2004
2004 in softball
Softball competitions in Greece
Softball at the 2004 Summer Olympics